Jambulingam Nadar was a notorious brigand of the southern Madras Presidency in the early 20th century. He was shot to death by the police on 20 March 1923.

History 
Born in Vadalivilai , Tirunelveli district of the state of modern Madras Presidency, he grew up working as a farm-hand, until in his early to mid-twenties he took to the road and became a highwayman along the Travancore-Madras Presidency border, operating mainly in the districts of Kanyakumari and Tinnevelly. He formed a band of desperadoes which, at its height, comprised some twenty to thirty men, notably amongst them, Kasi Nadan, Kalluli Mangan and Doravappa, Jambulingam's right-hand man.

They started by waylaying travellers on the highways between Madras and Travancore, an act in which they were in no small measure helped by the poor policing of the densely forested frontier. Also abetting them was the division of jurisdiction between the British forces in the Madras Presidency and the Royal Police in Travancore.

Jambulingam Nadar's modus operandi was to have his gang lay in wait in thickets or copses, signalling each other with owl-hoots or whistles, awaiting unwitting passers-by on foot or on bullock-cart. Upon locating a suitable target they would track them down until a safe opportunity presented itself to ambush them, without risk to themselves. After relieving their victims of their valuables, they would turn their bullocks loose, to give themselves time to get away.

Emboldened by the success of their ventures in the forests, they started striking in the smaller towns and villages in the area, especially in the early hours of the morning, expanding their haunts to include parts of modern-day Tuticorin district, making a regular menace of themselves, and constituting an excellent bogeyman for the children of the area.

Their fast-growing notoriety brought upon them the unwelcome attention of the law, by the mid-1920s, with the Madras and Travancore police commencing joint patrols of the forests of Aramboly, where Jambulingam was reputed to have his hide-out. Rewards offered for information leading to Jambulingam's capture were to no avail for long, for he maintained the favour of the villagers and peasants by parcelling out his loot with them.

However, c. 1926-'27, information was provided to the Madras Police by one of Jambulingam's gang-members, which led to his being surprised near Aramboly and shot in the act of making his escape. While Doravappa attempted to continue their nefarious work, he was captured by the police in a short while. The gang disbanded soon thereafter.

Legacy

A biography was written of Jambulinga Nadar, after his death, by one of the police-officers entrusted with his capture.

At the height of their terror, a popular Tamil ditty made the rounds of the area. It ran thus:

Jambulinga Nadan pora vazhi, jannalgal ellam thavudu podi,

Kasi Nadan pora vazhi, kadhavugal ellam thavudu podi,

Kalluli Mangan Pora vazhi, kallugal ellam thavudu podi,

Doravappa pora vazhi - enn aatha! naan poga matein.

To translate into English:

Jambulinga Nadan's way is marked with broken windows,

Kasi Nadan's way is marked with stoved-in doors,

Kalluli Mangan's way is marked by stones powdered,

Doravappa's way - I wouldn't venture that for the love of my mother!

In popular culture
Jayan portrays Jambulingan in the 1979 Malayalam film Vellayani Paramu. The 1982 Malayalam film Jambulingam stars Prem Nazir in the lead role.

References

People of the Kingdom of Travancore
Indian robbers
Indian highwaymen